The Colne Valley and Halstead Railway (CVHR) is a closed railway between Haverhill, Suffolk and Chappel and Wakes Colne, Essex, in England.

History

A railway in the Colne Valley was first proposed in 1846 when the Colchester, Stour Valley, Sudbury and Halstead Railway Company was incorporated to build a line from Marks Tey on the Eastern Counties Railway to Sudbury, with a branch to Halstead and a line from Colchester to Hythe. A later extension to Bury St. Edmunds and Clare was also approved, however a shortage of funds resulted in only the Stour Valley Railway to Sudbury and the line to Hythe being built.

In 1856, the Colne Valley and Halstead Railway Company was formed by local people to build a branch line from Chappel and Wakes Colne railway station to Halstead.

A  extension was authorised on 13 August 1859 and opened in stages:
 1 July 1861 Halstead–Castle Hedingham
 26 May 1862 Castle Hedingham–Yeldham
 10 May 1863 Yeldham–Haverhill (CVHR)

Physical connection with the Stour Valley Railway at Haverhill was provided in 1865, and although close relations were maintained with the Great Eastern Railway, the Colne Valley and Halstead Railway remained completely independent until it became part of the London and North Eastern Railway in the 1923 regrouping. The CVHR station, renamed Haverhill South, was closed to passengers in 1924 but remained open for goods until 1965.

Heritage railway preservation 

The line remained open until 30 December 1961, when passenger traffic ended. In 1965, freight traffic ended, and the line was taken up a year later.

A mile of track was reconstructed in 1973-75 as the Colne Valley Railway, including Castle Hedingham station. In 2012, the site of the former  station was cleared for a pathway, the most likely site for any future extension.

Nature reserve
A stretch of the former track north and east of Earls Colne is now the Colne Valley Local Nature Reserve.

References

External links
Marks Tey–Bures–Sudbury Rail Line (1849–1990)
The Sudbury Line Website News and Information about the Sudbury Branch

 
Rail transport in Essex
Rail transport in Suffolk
Railway companies established in 1856
Railway lines opened in 1860
Railway companies disestablished in 1923
Closed railway lines in the East of England
London and North Eastern Railway constituents
British companies established in 1856
British companies disestablished in 1923